I Syv Sind is the debut album by Danish electronic musician Mike Sheridan, released in September 2008 under the record label Playground Music Scandinavia. The album features vocals by Frida Hilarius and Maya Albana. The cover photograph was taken in Reykjanes.

In 2013, Neill Blomkamp's film Elysium featured the track 'Stjernekiggeri'.

Track listing

References 

2008 debut albums